Klimmen-Ransdaal railway station is located between the villages of Klimmen and Ransdaal in the municipality of Voerendaal, the Netherlands. The station opened on 1 March 1915.

It became national heritage site #507162 on 11 November 1998.

Train services
Klimmen-Ransdaal station is served by Arriva with the following local train services:
Stoptrein S4: Maastricht–Heerlen

References

External links
NS website 
Dutch public transport travel planner 

Railway stations in Limburg (Netherlands)
Railway stations opened in 1915
Railway stations on the Heuvellandlijn
Buildings and structures in Voerendaal